Cã Mamudo is a village in the Gabú Region of central-eastern Guinea-Bissau. It lies to the west of Lenquete and southeast of Sonaco.

References

External links
Maplandia World Gazetteer

Populated places in Guinea-Bissau
Gabu Region